Ellon Park and Ride is a park and ride facility near Ellon, UK.

History 
The facility opened in 2000. In 2012, expansion plans were approved by the council. In 2014, the first stage of the work was completed with 40 parking spaces added. However, the remainder of the expansion was delayed due to uncertainty over who owned an area of land that was to be compulsorily purchased, and the discovery that a water went across the area to be developed. The COVID-19 pandemic was cited as a reason for further delays. In late 2021, new stances were installed.

The improvement project was completed in October 2022.

Services

Current 

 Buchan Express

Withdrawn 

 747 Aberdeen Airport–Peterhead

References 

Park and ride schemes in the United Kingdom